Far From Heaven is a 2013 musical with a book by Richard Greenberg, music by Scott Frankel, and lyrics by Michael Korie. The musical is adapted from Todd Haynes's 2002 film of the same name. The  musical tells the story of Cathy Whitaker, a 1950s housewife, living in wealthy suburban Connecticut as she sees her seemingly perfect life begin to fall apart. The musical deals with complex contemporary issues such as race, gender roles, sexual orientation and class.

Production
The musical had a developmental premiere at the Williamstown Theatre Festival in July 2012. Directed by Michael Greif, the cast starred Kelli O'Hara and Steven Pasquale. Michael Korie explained the concept: "It's a mostly-music musical — in a Rodgers and Hammerstein vein, where you take the characters seriously. You don't write genre cream-puff songs. You write from character."

The musical premiered Off-Broadway at Playwrights Horizons on June 2, 2013 where it ran until July 7, 2013. Directed by Michael Greif, Choreographed by Alex Sanchez, the production starred Kelli O'Hara as Cathy Whitaker, Steven Pasquale as Frank Whitaker, Isaiah Johnson as Raymond Deagan, Nancy Anderson as Eleanor Fine, Quincy Tyler Bernstine as Sybil, J.B. Adams as Dr. Bowman/Morris Farnsworth, James Moye as Stan Fine, Alma Cuervo as Mona Lauder, Sarah Jane Shanks as Doreen/ Connie, Mary Stout as Mrs. Leacock and Jake Lucas as David Whitaker.

Plot
In a suburb of Hartford, Connecticut in 1957, Cathy Whitaker is an upper-middle class wife, mother and homemaker. She finds out that her husband Frank has had secret homosexual desires, which he has fulfilled. Her world is shaken but she cannot confide in her friend Eleanor. The widowed black gardener Raymond Deagan attempts to comfort her, but she is put off by gossip about them. Frank and Cathy seek help from the psychiatrist Dr. Bowman, in an attempt to "cure" Frank of his homosexual desires.

Musical numbers
Source: CurtainUp

Act 1
Seasons – Orchestra
Autumn in Connecticut – Cathy, Sybil, David, Janice, Eleanor, Neighborhood Ladies
You Like? – Eleanor, Cathy
Once Upon a Time – Janice, Cathy
If It Hadn't Been – Frank, Cathy
Table Talk – David, Janice, Sybil, Frank, Cathy
Mrs. Magnatech – Mrs. Leacock
Office Talk – Frank, Connie, Stan
Once a Week – Nancy, Doreen, Eleanor, Cathy
Sun and Shade – Raymond, Cathy
Table Talk – David, Sybil, Janice, Cathy
Secrets – Frank, Cathy
If It Hadn't Been (Reprise) – Frank
Interesting – Gallery Patrons, Mona Lauder, Morris Farnsworth
Miro – Raymond, Cathy
Once a Year – Party Guests, Frank, Cathy
Cathy, I'm Your Friend – Eleanor, Cathy
The Only One – Cathy, Raymond

Act 2
Rumors – Mona Lauder, Ladies
The Only One (Reprise) – Raymond, Cathy
Table Talk – David, Janice, Frank, Cathy
The Feminine Touch – Jackie, Fran
Wandering Eyes – Latin Singer
Table Talk – Janice, David, Cathy, Frank, Sybil
Rumors (Reprise) – Mona Lauder, Ladies
I Never Knew – Frank
Cathy, I'm Your Friend (Reprise) – Eleanor, Cathy
A Picture in Your Mind – Raymond, Cathy
Tuesdays, Thursdays – Cathy
Table Talk – David, Janice
Finale / Autumn in Connecticut (Reprise) – Cathy

Critical response
The TheaterMania reviewer wrote: "Frankel and Korie blitz the audience with a barrage of dreamy and reflective songs with complicated harmonies, but rarely do those numbers reach a boil or satisfying resolution... Greenberg hews remarkably close to the original plot and that is a good thing in that it maintains the thing that sets 'Far From Heaven' apart from the myriad gay dramas...:The story doesn't focus on the trials and tribulations of Frank as a closeted gay man but the effect his closet has on the people around him."

Awards and nominations
Nominations
2013 Artios Award Nomination - New York Theatre-Comedy or Musical, Alaine Alldaffer
2014 Lucille Lortel Award Nomination - Outstanding Costume Design, Catherine Zuber
2014 Outer Critics Circle Nomination - Outstanding New Off-Broadway Musical
2014 Drama Desk Award Nomination - Outstanding Lyrics, Michael Korie
2014 Henry Hewes Awards Nomination - Costume Design, Catherine Zuber

References

2013 musicals
Off-Broadway musicals
Musicals based on films
Connecticut in fiction
Fiction set in 1957